The North Shore, in the context of geography of the Island of Oahu, refers to the north-facing coastal area of Oahu between Kaena Point and Kahuku. The largest settlement is Haleiwa.

This area is best known for its massive waves, attracting surfers from all around the globe.

Surfing

The northern hemisphere winter months on the North Shore see a concentration of surfing activity, taking advantage of swells originating in the stormy North Pacific. Notable surfing spots include Waimea Bay and Sunset Beach.

Banzai Pipeline, located at Ehukai Beach, is the most famous surfing spot on the North Shore and is consistently ranked one of the top surf spots in the world. It is a prime spot for competitions due to its close proximity to the beach, giving spectators, judges, and photographers a great view.

The North Shore is considered to be the surfing mecca of the world. Every December, the area hosts three competitions, which make up the Triple Crown of Surfing.  
The three men's competitions are the Hawaiian Pro, the O'Neill World Cup of Surfing, and the Billabong Pipeline Masters.
The Pipe Masters was founded in 1971 and is regarded as the sport's top surfing contest. The three women's competitions are the Hawaiian Pro, the Roxy Pro Sunset, and the Billabong Pro on the neighboring island of Maui.

Waimea Bay hosts the Quiksilver Big Wave Invitational in Memory of Eddie Aikau.  This is an exclusive competition that participants must be invited to.  The competitions has a scheduled window of dates each winter, however the competition has a minimum requirement of consistent,  waves.  Therefore, the competition is not held every year.

Although the North Shore is known for its large winter surf, there are a number of surf schools that teach a beginner the basics of surfing in coves that are protected from the larger waves.

Television and film

Due to its natural environment, proximity to Honolulu, and large waves, the North Shore is a popular area for filming.

The documentary film Bustin' Down the Door (2008) chronicles the rise of professional surfing in the early 1970s.

The Fox Network TV show North Shore was filmed there. ABC's Lost was filmed almost entirely on O'ahu, with much of it filmed on the North Shore, including in the area of Turtle Bay.

The North Shore was also the setting for the movies Ride the Wild Surf (1964), North Shore (1987), Blue Crush (2002), The Big Bounce (2004), and Forgetting Sarah Marshall (2008), as well as being fictionalized for the animated film Surf's Up.

Since December 2015 Hale'iwa and Pupukea have been the setting for the popular German reality TV show Die Reimanns portraying the life of the Reimann family on their lush estate in Sunset Hills.

Accommodation

The North Shore only houses one large commercial hotel, the Turtle Bay Resort, which also has two world-class golf courses designed by Arnold Palmer and George Fazio.
Other accommodations are available in privately run condos, house rentals, and a youth hostel.

Activities
While the North Shore is most famous for its surfing, there are a number of other popular activities on the North Shore including hiking, scuba diving, shark cage diving, snorkeling, food trucks, foilboard, shopping, shave ice, dolphin tours, etc.

Floods and beach erosion

The surf during the winter months regularly cause flooding along the North Shore, which may lead to temporary closure of Kamehameha Highway, erosion of some beaches, and take a toll on oceanfront homes. 

North Shore is known for its extreme high surf in the winter season, starting around early November and possibly lasting to as long as June or July. Waves around this time averages out to around 16 feet, measured from top to bottom of the waves “face” -- the side of the wave that faces the shore. However, during the peak of the season, these waves can rise to around 45 to even 60 feet in size. Because of this extreme size and power that occurs every winter, coastal erosion increases and can pose a great threat to houses along the shoreline. 

Moreover, these intense swells also cause the tide to rise to unusually high levels, further contributing to coastal erosion and also leading to major flooding throughout the North Shore. These floods can disrupt coastal wetlands, putting important ecosystems in danger and threatening their habitat. It can also greatly damage business and economy in the North Shore, especially in Haleiwa, as it can damage shop interiors, merchandise, and force certain businesses to close. 

Although the majority of the North Shore’s coastal erosion is caused by the extreme surf during the winter season, there are many other factors that contribute to erosion such as climate change and rising sea levels. Climate change, referring to a change in the usual weather patterns and temperatures, often results in rising sea levels because of thermal expansion in the water. As our ocean waters continue to get hotter due to climate change, it expands resulting in the rising sea levels. 

From 1950 to 2015 our oceans temperature rose by 1.2 degrees Fahrenheit. This may seem like an extremely gradual process, but because our oceans are so massive, it can be extremely significant. In fact, this change in temperature has actually led to more than 6 inches of sea level rise, causing on average a 233% increase in tidal flooding across the U.S. Higher seas amplify the effects of storms, hurricanes, rainstorms, and high tide, increasing the significance of these events. However, the majority of this rise in sea level occurred in the last 20 years because the rate of sea level rise is accelerating, with levels rising about one inch every eight years, and that rate is expected to continue accelerating. 

As for Hawai’i specifically, the speed at which the sea levels are rising has increased, with levels rising as much as one inch every four years. Scientists expect sea levels to continue rising, forecasting that in the next twelve years, the sea level will have risen by another six inches depending on how fast the ocean will warm and the ice will melt. This combination of a constant gradual rise in sea levels, climate change, extreme surf, susceptibility to storms, floods, hurricanes, and high tides causes a great level of coastal erosion that can put homeowners on the shoreline at extremely high risk. Moreover, this erosion can permanently change the beaches and surf breaks on the North Shore because of the severe amount of land lost.

Communities
Haleiwa
Kahuku
Mokuleia
Pupukea
Waialua
Waimea Bay

Notable residents

Rochelle Ballard, professional surfer
Owl Chapman, surfer and surfboard shaper
Darrick Doerner, surfer
Jim Evans, artist
John John Florence, professional surfer
Brian Grazer, Oscar-winning film and television producer
Bruce Irons, professional surfer
Jack Johnson, folk rock singer-songwriter
Samuel Kamakau, historian 
Stanley Kennedy Sr., founder of Hawaiian Airlines
Jamie O'Brien, professional surfer
Frederick Patacchia, professional surfer
Makua Rothman, professional surfer
Arto Saari, professional skateboarder and photographer
Paul Theroux, American travel writer and novelist
Butch Van Artsdalen, surfer

References

External links 

 Oahu Surf Conditions, Radar, and Forecasts
 'Life Among The Swells': William Finnegan from Outside magazine gives a detailed insight into the professional surfing world on the North Shore of Oahu.
 Oahu North Shore Chamber of Commerce
 "The Drive-By Coast."  Hana Hou!  Vol. 10, No. 2 (April/May 2007 issue; 7 pages).  Article by Curt Sanburn, photographs by Dana Edmunds.

Geography of Oahu
Surfing locations in Hawaii